There have been several Democratic Republic of the Congo earthquakes. This may refer to:

 1966 Toro earthquake
 2002 Kalehe earthquake
 2005 Lake Tanganyika earthquake
 2008 Lake Kivu earthquake
 2015 South Kivu earthquake